Capital Kings was an American pop, EDM and Christian pop act. The group went on indefinite hiatus on January 3, 2018. The group originally consisted of producer and rapper Cole Walowac and singer Jon White, who was later replaced by Dylan Housewright.

History
Jon White and Cole Walowac formed Capital Kings while still living in their hometown of Washington D.C. Jon White stated that he met Cole in his church nursery and that "we started playing in the youth group band... Cole would play drums and I would sing and that's how we started making music."

Their debut album Capital Kings was released on January 8, 2013 and entered the Billboard Christian Albums Chart in the Top 5.

They released a remix album, Remixd, on March 11, 2014, that included six remixed songs from their first album, and a new song, "Be a King".

Their second album, II, was released on October 2, 2015.

On February 23, 2016, during the Hits Deep Tour of which Capital Kings was a part, White announced he would be leaving the group to make solo music under the name Nevada, leaving Walowac as the only member. Within a few months, rumors began circulating that Dylan Housewright would be Jon White's replacement after he went on tour with Cole Walowac, and soon he became the unannounced new replacement for White after the release of their single "I Can't Quit" featuring Reconcile.

In 2017, Capital Kings released a series of singles. "Love Is On Our Side" was released on June 2, 2017, "Don't Wanna Wake Up" was released on August 4, 2017, "All Good" was released on September 1, 2017 and "Rip It Up" was released on October 6, 2017. Following the release of these singles, Capital Kings announced they would be taking an indefinite hiatus due to the birth of Dylan Housewright's child. Walowac now produces music under the moniker "Saint X" and is signed to Warner Chappell.

Critical response

Capital Kings has received mainly positive reception since the release of their debut album. The Houston Chronicle noted that while there has been little success for crossover electronic-pop acts, "the one finally to break away from the herd just might be Capital Kings." CCM Magazine said "There's a new sound in town thanks to Capital Kings, whose ingenious blend of electronic, hip hop, pop and even some dubstep has inspired everyone from TobyMac to Group 1 Crew and Mandisa…[Capital Kings] is quickly growing into a formidable force of their own thanks to the new self-titled long player on Gotee Records."

Personnel

 Cole Edward Walowac – rapper, DJ, producer, vocals (2010–2018)
 Jonathan Dean "Jon" White – lead vocals, background vocals, DJ, producer (2010–2016)
 Dylan Housewright – lead vocals (2016–2018)

Discography

 2013 – Capital Kings
 2015 – II

Album appearances

Features

Remixes

Awards

GMA Dove Awards

References

External links 
 

American musical duos
American performers of Christian music
American synth-pop groups
Musical groups established in 2010
Musical groups from Washington, D.C.
Gotee Records artists
2010 establishments in Washington, D.C.